This is a list of Russian football transfers in the winter transfer window 2010–11 by club. Only clubs of the 2010 and 2011–12 Russian Premier League are included.

Russian Premier League 2010

Alania Vladikavkaz

In:

Out:

Amkar Perm

In:

Out:

Anzhi Makhachkala

In:

Out:

CSKA Moscow

In:

Out:

Dynamo Moscow

In:

Out:

Krylia Sovetov Samara

In:

Out:

Lokomotiv Moscow

In:

Out:

FC Rostov

In:

Out:

Rubin Kazan

In:

Out:

Saturn Moscow Oblast

In:

Out:

Sibir Novosibirsk

In:

Out:

Spartak Moscow

In:

Out:

Spartak Nalchik

In:

Out:

Terek Grozny

In:

Out:

Tom Tomsk

In:

Out:

Zenit Saint Petersburg

In:

Out:

Russian Premier League 2011–12

FC Krasnodar

In:

Out:

Kuban Krasnodar

In:

Out:

Volga Nizhny Novgorod

In:

Out:

References

Transfers
Transfers
2010-11
Russia